Soroavisaurus is a genus of enantiornithean birds related to Avisaurus. It lived during the Late Cretaceous of Argentina. The only known species, S. australis, is known from fossils collected from the Lecho Formation (Maastrichtian age) of Estancia El Brete, in the southern tip of the province of Salta, Argentina. A binominal name of this animal means "Southern sister Avisaur".

Description 
The specimens are in the collection of the Fundación-Instituto Miguel Lillo, Tucumán. They are cataloged as PVL-4690, a -long left tarsometatarsus, and PVL-4048, which includes another left tarsometatarsus, -long and associated with the whole hallux, or digit I, and four intermediate phalanges. PVL-4048 was previously described as "Avisaurus sp." (see Avisaurus).

Phylogeny 
The cladogram below is from Wang et al., 2022:

Key to letters:

b = Boluochia
c = Cathayornis
e = Enantiophoenix
f = Houornis
h = Longipteryx
i = Parabohaiornis
j = Pterygornis
l = Vorona
m = Yuanjiawaornis
n = Yungavolucris

Paleobiology 
Due to their large size and strong talons, Soroavisaurus could occupy the same ecological niche as extanct birds of prey, noticing prey from afar on the plains or in water.

References 

Avisaurids
Bird genera
Maastrichtian life
Cretaceous birds of South America
Late Cretaceous animals of South America
Cretaceous Argentina
Fossils of Argentina
Lecho Formation
Fossil taxa described in 1993
Taxa named by Luis M. Chiappe